"No Self Control" is a song written and performed by English rock musician Peter Gabriel.

It was inspired by Steve Reich's composition Music for 18 Musicians. The song features guest musicians Robert Fripp (guitar), Phil Collins (drums) and Kate Bush (backing vocals).

Prior to being recorded for Gabriel's 1980 album, the song was performed live under the working title "I don't know how to stop". Later live performances, such as on Plays Live, were slower and more subdued than the studio recording.

Gabriel and his China 1984 touring band performed "No Self Control" on BBC One's Top of the Pops in May 1980.

Track listing

7" UK single (1980)
 "No Self Control" – 3:47
 "Lead a Normal Life" – 4:10

Personnel
Peter Gabriel – lead vocals
Kate Bush – backing vocals
David Rhodes – guitar
Robert Fripp – guitar
John Giblin – bass guitar
Larry Fast – synthesizers, processing
Phil Collins – drums
Morris Pert – percussion

Charts

In other works
It was used in the season three episode of Homicide: Life on the Streets, The City That Bleeds.

References

Peter Gabriel songs
1980 singles
Songs written by Peter Gabriel
Song recordings produced by Steve Lillywhite
Experimental rock songs
1980 songs
Charisma Records singles